Regine Schumann (born February 23, 1961) is a German  artist who is classified as a light artist and a contemporary art painter and installation artist.

Life and work
Regine Schumann studied from 1982 to 1989 at the Hochschule für Bildene Künste Braunschweig art. In 1989 she was acknowledged as a master student of Roland Dörfler. From 1986 to 1994 she was a member of the artist group Freiraum, consisting of Frank Fuhrmann, Dieter Hinz and herself. Aside of numerous scholarships (amongst others a DAAD-scholarship for Italy in 1990 and a grant from the state of North Rhine-Westphalia for Japan in 2000 ) and contracts for public art, she received the Leo Breuer Prize in 2006. Regine Schumann lives and works in Cologne.

In her work Regine Schumann focuses on light effects caused by fluorescent materials. Some of the materials she uses are colored polylight-cords and different colored acrylic panels, which she composes into complex colour spaces in accordance to Goethe's theory of colours. The artist also uses blacklight to complement the other colours.

The emphasis of her room-specific installations is the extension of the existing architecture to a dimension of vibration and - as she calls it - the configuration of a room temperature: "Der Einbezug bildhauerischer Prinzipien wie Hängen, Legen, Arrangieren, Verspannen, Umhüllen ist charakteristisch für die Arbeit Regine Schumanns und führt das Denken in Farben und Farbräumen in eine räumlich erfahrbare Plastizität über." ("The inclusion of sculptural principles as hanging, laying, arranging, conjointing, jacketing is characteristic of the work of Regine Schumann and leads towards a thinking in colors and color spaces in a spatially experiential plasticity.")

Regine Schumann describes her method of operation in this way: "Das Material des farbigen und fluoreszierenden Acrylglases spielt hierbei eine wichtige Rolle. Der von mir verwendete Werkstoff leuchtet, sobald ihm Lichtenergie zugeführt wird, sei es in Form von natürlichem Tageslicht oder von Kunstlicht. Durch die unterschiedlich farbigen Platten ergibt sich je nach Standort ein Durchleuchten, Schichten, Mischen und Selektieren." ("The material of the colored and fluorescent acrylic glass plays an important role here. The material I use glows as soon as it receives light energy, be it in the form of natural daylight or artificial light. Depending on the location, the different colored panels result in a transmission, merging, mixing and selection.")

The constant changes and effects of light is what fascinates the artist and what she focuses her room-specific installations and works on.

Collections
 Kunstmuseum Celle, Germany
 Rheinisches Landesmuseum Bonn, Germany
 Centrum Kunstlicht in de Kunst, Eindhoven, The Netherlands
 Stadtmuseum Oldenburg,   Germany
 Stroom Foundation, The Hague, The Netherlands
 Städtisches Museum Engen, Germany
 Kulturstiftung Annelies und Gerhard Derriks, Fürstenfeldbruck, Germany
 Staatliches Museum Schwerin, Germany
 Museum Ritter, Waldenbruch, Germany
 Das kleine Museum of Weißenstadt,  Germany
 Kunsthalle Osnabrück, Osnabrück, Germany
 Museum für Angewandte Kunst Köln

Artinstallations in Public Places 

 2001: Transparent und Spiegelung (Transparent and Reflection), InnSide Hotel, Düsseldorf, Germany 
 2001: Cardo, Gesellschaft für Industrieforschung (Society for Industrial Research), Alsdorf, Germany
 2002: Farblinien (Colourlines), Astron Hotel, Cologne, Germany
 2002: Tubies, Wall Covering at Retirement Home St. Josefpflege, Ludwigshafen, Germany 
 2003: Connection und Wasserlauf (Connection and Flowing Water Body), CiV Hilden, Germany
 2005: Doppelblende (Twin Orifice), CTcon business consultancy, Bonn und Frankfurt, Germany
 2006: Lightline and Flying Circles, Wateringse Veld College, Kommission Stroom, The Hague, The Netherlands
 2006: Schlitz, Leitstelle der Polizei im Saarland (Coordinationcenter of the police department in Saarland), Saarbrücken, Germany
 2007: Soft Colourmirrors, Herzzentrum der Universitätsklinik Köln (Heart Unit of the University Clinic, Cologne), Germany 
 2009: Thoughts, Multinational Law Firm Freshfields Bruckhaus Deringer, Hamburg, Germany 
 2010: Die Fuge, Artinstallation at the outside facade of the Headquarter of the Sparkasse Gütersloh–Rietberg, Gütersloh, Germany
 2011:  Multinational Law Firm Freshfields Bruckhaus Deringer, Hamburg, Germany 
 2011: Cameo, Unfallzentrale Nordrheinwestfalen (Headquarters of the Crash-Centre North Rhine-Westphalia), Münster, Germany
 2012:  Leuchtwerke (Luminous Works), Hotel Barceló, Hamburg, Germany
 2013: Brix, Kreishandwerkerschaft Mönchengladbach (District Association of Craftspeople Mönchengladbach), Germany
 2020:  Design of the interior of the Erlöserkirche, Bad Godesberg, Germany

Solo exhibitions 
 2000: Regine Schumann: Spring: Roominstallation, Artothek Cologne, Germany
 2001: Nachtschwärmer (Night revellers), Stadtmuseum Oldenburg, Germany
 2003: Leopold-Hoesch-Museum, Düren, Germany
 2003: Reiseluft, Kunstverein Gelsenkirchen, Gelsenkirchen, Germany
 2005: Night Owls, Centrum Kunstlicht in de Kunst, Eindhoven, The Netherlands
 2006: Candela, Städtische Galerie Villa Zanders, Bergisch Gladbach, Germany
 2008: Glow Worms, Installation, Markthalle, St. Peter Port, Guernsey, Great Britain 
 2009: Leuchtstücke, DA-Kunsthaus, Kloster Gravenhorst, Hörstel, Germany
 2010: Black Box, Museum Ritter, Waldenbuch, Germany
 2011: Jump, Kunstverein Heidenheim, Germany 
 2014: Moving picture, Museum gegenstandsfreier Kunst,
 2018: Colormirror, Dep Art Gallery, Milan, Italy
 2019: Feel Color, Galerie Judith Andreae, Bonn, Germany
 2020: Push borders, Galeríe Rafael Pérez Hernando, Madrid, Spain 
 2020: Regine Schumann, Axel Pairon Gallery, Knokke-Heist, Belgium
 2020: Light Joy!, Taguchi Fine Art, Tokio, Japan
 2021: Chromasophia, Dep Art Gallery, Milano, Italy

Group exhibitions 
 2004: Kunstlicht, E–Werk Hallen für Kunst, Freiburg, Germany 
 2006: Lichtkunst, Kunstmuseum Celle, Germany 
 2007: Licht Glas Transparenz, Kunsthalle Osnabrück, Germany 
 2010: Gruppenausstellung Gabriele-Münter-Preis, Martin-Gropius-Bau, Berlin; Frauenmuseum Bonn, Bonn, Germany 
 2011: Streng geometrisch, Museum Moderner Kunst Kärnten, Klagenfurt, Austria
 2013: Scheinwerfer – European Light Art , Kunstmuseum Celle, Germany 
 2013: Licht. Kunst. Kinetik,  Museum Ritter, Waldenbuch, Germany
 2015: Enlight my Space,  Kunsthalle Bremen, Germany
 2015: ¡dark!, Unna, Centre for International Light Art, Germany  
 2015: Lichtungen. Internationales Lichtkunstfestival (Lightings. International Light art Festival), Roemer- und Pelizaeus-Museum Hildesheim, Hildesheim, Germany
 2015: Wege zum Licht (Paths to the Light), Goethe-Museum, Düsseldorf, Germany
 2017: FarbeLicht – LichtFarbe. Dem Licht auf der Spur., Neuer Kunstverein Aschaffenburg, Germany 
 2017: Signal. Lichtkunst aus der Sammlung Robert Simon, Kunstmuseum Celle, Germany 
 2017: Rot kommt vor Rot, Collection presentation Museum Ritter Waldenbuch, Germany 
 2018: Labyrinth konkret ... mit Nebenwegen (Labyrinth concrete ... with side paths), Museum im Kulturspeicher, Würzburg, Germany
 2019: Premio Lissone, Museo d'Arte Contemporanea, Lissone, Italy
 2019: Goethe. Verwandlung der Welt, Bundeskunsthalle, Bonn, Germany
 2020: Lichtbild (Light picture), Orangerie Stiftung Schloss und Park Benrath, Düsseldorf, Germany
 2020: Musterung. Pop und Politik in der zeitgenössischen Textilkunst (Patterning. Pop and politics in contemporary textile art), Chemnitz, Germany
 2020: Fluoridescent, Galerie Renate Bender, Munich, Germany
 2021: Art is Hope, Taguchi Fine Art, Tokyo, Japan

Videography (Selection)= 
 2021: Regine Schumann Chromasophia, 03′ 19″

Bibliography
 
 
 
 
 
Regine Schumann: Colormirror, curated by Alberto Zanchetta, Dep Art Gallery, Milan, 2018,

References

External links
 Website of the artist
 - Regine Schumann on artfacts.net

1961 births
Living people
Light artists
20th-century German painters
21st-century German painters
Modern painters
German abstract artists
German contemporary artists
People from Goslar
20th-century German women artists
21st-century German women artists
German women painters